The Grand Theatre of Rabat is a large performing arts center under construction in Rabat, the capital city of Morocco. The building is designed by Zaha Hadid and her architectural firm Zaha Hadid Architects. Planning began for the project in 2010 and construction officially started on October 7, 2014. Completion of the project was scheduled for late 2019. The building is among the last projects designed by Zaha Hadid before her passing in 2016.

The construction of the theatre is part of a wider national initiative by King Mohammed VI to promote the arts and cultural development. The Grand Theatre is planned to be one of the centerpieces of a new 110-hectare mixed-use district on the shores of the Bou Regreg River, including malls, residential areas, a national archive, a new archaeological museum, and a business district with skyscrapers on the Salé side of the river.

The curving design of the structure is inspired by both the nearby river's winding course and by the aesthetics of Arabic calligraphy. Other elements take their cues from Islamic architecture. The building includes an 1800-seat interior theatre and a 7000-seat open-air amphitheatre.

References 

Buildings and structures in Rabat
Zaha Hadid buildings
Theatres in Morocco